Kimberly "Kim" Black (born April 30, 1978) is an American former competition swimmer and Olympic gold medalist.

Black began her college swimming career at the University of Southern California, where she competed alongside future fellow Olympians such as Lindsay Benko, before transferring to the University of Georgia in 1999.  She graduated from UGA in 2001 and was named the NCAA Woman of the Year Award for 2001. She is also recipient of an NCAA Post-Graduate scholarship in 2001.  She was on the U.S. Women's swimming team in the 2000 Summer Olympics where she won a gold medal in the 800 meter freestyle relay.  During her swimming career at Georgia, she was a four – time All-American and helped lead the Lady Bulldogs to three straight NCAA championships.  Black was also awarded the Today's Top VIII Award as a member of the Class of 2002.  She was the female winner of the National Collegiate Athletic Association's highest academic honor, the 2001 Walter Byers Award, in recognition of being the nation's top female scholar-athlete.

She was in the 2002 Top VIII class with Emily Bloss, André Davis, Misty Hyman, Leah Juno, Nancy Metcalf, Bryce Molder, and Ruth Riley.  The 2001 Male Walter Byers Scholar was Bradley Henderson.

See also
 List of Olympic medalists in swimming (women)
 List of University of Georgia people

References

External links
 
 

1978 births
Living people
American female freestyle swimmers
Georgia Bulldogs women's swimmers
Olympic gold medalists for the United States in swimming
People from Liverpool, New York
Swimmers at the 2000 Summer Olympics
USC Trojans women's swimmers
Medalists at the 2000 Summer Olympics
Universiade medalists in swimming
Universiade gold medalists for the United States
Universiade silver medalists for the United States
Medalists at the 1997 Summer Universiade
Medalists at the 1999 Summer Universiade